Villu Pattukaran is a 1992 Tamil-language drama film directed by Gangai Amaran. The film stars Ramarajan, Rani and Chandrasekhar. It was released on 27 November 1992.

Plot 

Kalimuthu is the lead singer of a group performing Villu Paatu. The village head decides to reconstruct the tumbledown village temple and gives Kalimuthu responsibility for funding money. Finally, the music composer Ilaiyaraaja helps them financially. Then, Kalimuthu approaches a reputed sculptor from another village. The sculptor and his daughter Abhirami come to their village. Later, Kalimuthu and Abhirami fall in love with each other. Abhirami's father wants to marry Abhirami to his nephew Rajasekharan while the village head's son Chelladurai (Vikas Rishi), a womaniser, has an eye for Abhirami. What transpires later forms the crux of the story.

Cast 

Ramarajan as Kalimuthu
Rani as Abhirami
Chandrasekhar as Inspector Rajasekharan
M. N. Nambiar as Abhirami Grandfather
Vikas Rishi as Chelladurai
Goundamani as Appakannu
Senthil as Thangappan
Kula Deivam V. R. Rajagopal
Shanmugasundaram
S. N. Lakshmi as Kalimuthu's mother
Vaani as Kamachi
Vijayadurga
Karuppu Subbiah
Thirupur Ramasamy
Kullamani
R. K. as Inspector
Ilaiyaraaja in a cameo appearance
Gangai Amaran in a cameo appearance
Rajkiran in a cameo appearance

Soundtrack 
The music was composed by Ilaiyaraaja, with lyrics written by Vaali and Gangai Amaran.

Reception 
Ayyappa Prasad of The Indian Express stated "the film has a very weak storyline" but praised the film's songs.

References

External links 
 

1990s Tamil-language films
1992 drama films
1992 films
Films directed by Gangai Amaran
Films scored by Ilaiyaraaja
Indian drama films